106 Squadron is a territorial reserve squadron of the South African Air Force.  The squadron operations include coastal reconnaissance, command and control and radio relay in crime prevention operations in cooperation with the South African Police.  The squadron is based at AFB Bloemspruit. Members of the squadron typically come from nearby areas, so that their knowledge of their patrol area can be utilized in crime prevention.

References

Squadrons of the South African Air Force
Military units and formations in Bloemfontein
Territorial Reserve Squadrons of the South African Air Force